Bulawayo (Ndebele: Bulawayo) is the second largest city in Zimbabwe, and the largest city in the country's Matabeleland region. The city's population is disputed; the 2022 census listed it at 665,940, while the Bulawayo City Council claimed it to be about 1.2 million. Along with the capital Harare, Bulawayo is one of two cities in Zimbabwe that is also a province.

Bulawayo was founded by a group led by Gundwane Ndiweni around 1840 as the kraal of Mzilikazi, the Ndebele king and was known as Gibixhegu. His son, Lobengula, succeeded him in the 1860s, and changed the name to kobulawayo and ruled from Bulawayo until 1893, when the settlement was captured by British South Africa Company soldiers during the First Matabele War. That year, the first white settlers arrived and rebuilt the town. The town was besieged by Ndebele warriors during the Second Matabele War. Bulawayo attained municipality status in 1897, and city status in 1943.

Historically, Bulawayo has been the principal industrial centre of Zimbabwe; its factories produce cars and car products, building materials, electronic products, textiles, furniture, and food products. Bulawayo is also the hub of Zimbabwe's rail network and the headquarters of the National Railways of Zimbabwe.

The majority of the city's population belong to the Ndebele people, with minorities of Shona and other groups. Bulawayo is home to over a dozen colleges and universities, most notably the National University of Science and Technology, Bulawayo Polytechic College, Zimbabwe School of Mines, and the United College of Education. The Natural History Museum of Zimbabwe, formerly the National Museum, is located in Bulawayo. The city is close to tourist sites such as Matobo National Park and the Khami World Heritage Site.

History

The city was founded by the Ndebele king Lobengula, the son of King Mzilikazi, born of Matshobana, who settled in modern-day Zimbabwe around the 1840s.  This followed the Ndebele people's great trek from northern Kwazulu. The name Bulawayo comes from the Ndebele word bulala and it translates to "the one to be killed". It is thought that at the time of the formation of the city there was a civil war. Mbiko ka Madlenya Masuku, a trusted confidant of King Mzilikazi and leader of the Zwangendaba regiment, fought Prince Lobhengula as he did not believe that he was the legitimate heir to the throne. This was because Lobhengula was born to a Swazi mother, and Masuku felt that she was of a lesser class. He named his capital "the place of the one to be killed". 

At the time Lobengula was a prince fighting to ascend his father's throne. It was common at the time for people to refer to Bulawayo as Bulawayo UmntwaneNkosi, "a place where they are fighting or rising against the prince". The city of Bulawayo coincidentally has a similar name to the capital of the great Zulu warrior king Shaka ka Senzangakhona in Kwazulu, where Mzilikazi and his Khumalo clan and other Nguni people came from. 

In the 1860s, the city was influenced by European intrigue. Many colonial powers cast covetous eyes on Bulawayo and the land surrounding it because of its strategic location. Britain made skillful use of private initiative in the shape of Cecil Rhodes and the Chartered Company to disarm the suspicion of her rivals. Lobengula once described Britain as a chameleon and himself as the fly.

During the 1893 First Matabele War, British South Africa Company (BSAC) troops invaded and forced King Lobengula to evacuate his followers, after first detonating munitions and setting fire to the town. BSAC troops and white settlers occupied the ruins. On 4 November 1893, Leander Starr Jameson declared Bulawayo a settlement under the rule of the BSAC. Cecil Rhodes ordered the new settlement to be founded on the ruins of Lobengula's royal kraal, a typical action by a conquering power. This is where the State House stands today.

In 1897, the new town of Bulawayo acquired the status of municipality in the British colonial system, and Lt. Col. Harry White was appointed as one of the first mayors.

Siege
At the outbreak of the Second Matabele War, in March 1896, Bulawayo was besieged by Ndebele forces. The settlers established a laager here for defensive purposes. The Ndebele had experienced the brutal effectiveness of the Maxim guns employed by BSAC troops in the First Matabele War, so they never mounted a significant attack against Bulawayo, although over 10,000 Ndebele warriors gathered to surround the town.  Rather than wait passively for attack, the settlers mounted patrols, called the Bulawayo Field Force, under Frederick Selous and Frederick Russell Burnham. These patrols rode out to rescue any surviving settlers in the countryside and attacked the Ndebele. In the first week of fighting, 20 men of the Bulawayo Field Force were killed and 50 were wounded. An unknown number of Ndebele were killed and wounded. 

During the siege, conditions in Bulawayo quickly deteriorated. By day, settlers could go to homes and buildings in the town, but at night they were forced to seek shelter in the much smaller laager. Nearly 1,000 women and children were crowded into the small area and false alarms of attacks were common. The Ndebele neglected to cut the telegraph lines connecting Bulawayo to Mafikeng. The settlers and forces appealed for relief, and the BSAC sent additional troops from Salisbury and Fort Victoria (now Harare and Masvingo respectively)  to the north, and from Kimberley and Mafeking  to the south. Once the relief forces arrived in late May 1896, the siege was broken. An estimated 50,000 Ndebele retreated into their stronghold of the Matobo Hills near Bulawayo. Not until October 1896 did the Ndebele finally surrender their arms to the invaders.

Modern Bulawayo
By the late 1930s, Bulawayo was no longer the country's biggest city. Influence and activity moved eastwards to the other cities, especially Salisbury, a trend which continues up to the present day. Despite this, after the Second World War, prosperity and population growth revived, as the city became an industrial powerhouse, peaking during the Federal years as new markets opened in Malawi and Zambia. However, Bulawayo trailed the development of other cities notably, Johannesburg, Harare and Cape Town during the same period. In 1943, Bulawayo received city status.

By 1992, population decline and slow growth were beginning to occur due to structural neoliberal reforms and underinvestment which disproportionately affected heavy industry. In response, Bulawayo sought to re-invent itself as a 'heritage city', with its wide main streets refurbished and its Victorian architecture and industrial heritage preserved. Institutions such as the Bulawayo Railway Museum and Nesbitt Castle were handsomely restored. The city was also recognised as a centre of excellence in tertiary education and research. The National University of Science and Technology, Zimbabwe was formed and expanded and other colleges growth also accelerated.

Since the late 20th century, Bulawayo has suffered a sharp fall in living standards coinciding with the protracted economic crisis affecting the country. The main challenges the city faces, include underinvestment, declining infrastructure, de-industrialisation and the effects of corruption and nepotism. Much of the city's educated workers have migrated south to neighbouring South Africa or further afield to the United Kingdom, Canada and Australia. Public service concerns have become steadily more acute, with particular concern in the health sector from a growing shortage of experienced doctors and nurses. As a result, the city faced an avoidable cholera outbreak in 2008. Though the city is the centre of the southern population generally categorized as the Matebele, the population includes various ethnicities, as well as a small number of expats, mostly from neighbouring countries.

The Central Business District has the widest roads. These were designed to accommodate the ox-drawn carts, and to allow them to make a turn in the street, that were used as a primary means of transport when the town was planned and erected.

Bulawayo is nicknamed the "City of Kings" or "kontuthu ziyathunqa"—a Ndebele phrase for "smoke arising". This name arose from the city's historically large industrial base. The large cooling towers of the coal-powered electricity generating plant situated in the city centre once used to exhaust steam and smoke over the city.

Following Operation Murambatsvina (Operation Drive out filth) in 2005, squatters who had been forcibly evicted from their homes in the Killarney and Ngozi Mine informal settlements returned to their shacks and started rebuilding them.

Suburbs

Retained the old estate name.

Demographics

Population census controversy
The population of Bulawayo, according to the 2012 national census, stood at 653,337; however, this figure has been rejected by the Bulawayo City Council authority with Councillor Martin Moyo claiming an anti-Bulawayo conspiracy to under-fund projects in the city.

Ethnic groups

The vast majority of Bulawayo City residents were Black African with 97.96%. Other ethnic groups in the city were Coloured (0.9%), White (0.75%), Asian (0.22%). Members of other ethnic groups comprised 0.02%, and 0.14% of the city did not state their ethnic group. There were 4,926 White Zimbabweans living in Bulawayo in 2012.

Economy
Bulawayo was known as the industrial hub of Zimbabwe. This has led to the Zimbabwe International Trade Fair being hosted in Bulawayo. It had a large manufacturing presence with large industries based here before Zimbabwe's economic decline.  However, some of these companies have either moved operations to Harare or have closed down — which has crippled Bulawayo's economy. Most factories are deserted and the infrastructure has since been left to deteriorate.  The reason for the de-industrialization has largely been political, with some factories like Goldstar Sugars removing machinery to open new factories in Harare. When the Zimbabwean government passed indigenisation laws, some successful businesses were taken over by ZANU–PF supporters, only to close down a few years later.

Many locals argue that it is because of marginalisation they experience against the government due to political tensions with the ZANU PF government in Harare and the MDC run Bulawayo council, for instance, the National railways of Zimbabwe (headquarters in Bulawayo) is a government owned entity and, as such, should have been thriving had it not been for embezzlement of funds by company executives who are believed to be Shona. The water issue is not new and had brought about the "help a thirsty Matabele" initiative of the 1970s and the Matabeleland Zambezi Water Project which would put an end to the water issue in Matabeleland was drafted; however, this project was put on hold soon after independence.

These allegations have all been refuted by national authorities. The city still contains the bulk of Zimbabwe's heavy industry and food processing capability.

Like many parts of the country, Bulawayo has for the past ten years seen a huge drop in service delivery and an increase in unemployment, with many who can opting to seek better prospects abroad. Many people resorted to farming, mining, and the black market for sustenance, while others depended on the little foreign currency that would be sent by family in other countries. However, with inauguration of the Mnangagwa government, a new approach is seen by investors in the city who admire the already-available infrastructure; the huge workforce; and Bulawayo as a potential business hub. It is set to once again contribute greatly to the economy of Zimbabwe.

Landmarks and Institutions

These include:

Ascot Centre
Bulawayo Centre
Bulawayo Golf Club
Fidelity Life Centre
Mhlahlandlela Government Complex
Nesbitt Castle
NRZ building
National University of Science and Technology

Government
Bulawayo is governed by the Bulawayo City Council, which is headed by the Mayor of Bulawayo.

Culture 

Bulawayo has museums of national importance, including the Natural History Museum of Zimbabwe, National Gallery, Bulawayo and the Bulawayo Railway Museum.

There are a number of parks in Bulawayo, including
 Centenary Park (which includes an amphitheatre, lawns and a large fountain)
 Barham Green
Hillside Dams Conservancy (which has a number of dams within it)
 Mabukweni

Geography
Bulawayo is located in the south west of Zimbabwe. It is in the middle of the savanna country. It has 4 seasons with rains starting in late October to about March. Coldest months being May and June with July being cold and windy.

Topography
The city sits on a plain that marks the Highveld of Zimbabwe and is close to the watershed between the Zambezi and Limpopo drainage basins. The land slopes gently downwards to the north and northwest. The southern side is hillier, and the land becomes more broken in the direction of the Matobo Hills to the south.

Climate
Due to its relatively high altitude, the city has a humid subtropical climate despite lying in the tropics. Under the Köppen climate classification, Bulawayo features a semiarid climate (BSh). As with much of southern and eastern Zimbabwe, Bulawayo is cooled by a prevailing southeasterly airflow most of the year and experiences three broad seasons: a dry, cool winter season from May to August; a hot dry period in early summer from late August to early November; and a warm wet period in the rest of the summer, early November to April.

The hottest month is October, which is usually the height of the dry season.

Most rain falls in the December to February period, while June to August is usually rainless. Being close to the Kalahari Desert, Bulawayo is vulnerable to droughts and rainfall tends to vary sharply from one year to another. In 1978,  of rain fell in the three months up to February (February 1944 is the wettest month on record with 368mm) while in the three months ending February 1983, only  fell.

Water supply 
Bulawayo has good-quality tap water owing to the management of the water authorities, meeting international standards. Bulawayo does not recycle waste water but uses treated waste water for irrigation. 

Bulawayo experiences water shortages in drought seasons due to the overwhelming increase in population versus the static and sometimes decreasing capacity of the reserve dams. The geographical factors causing water scarcity are rising temperatures, the area's high elevation and the arid environment of Matabeleland.

Environmental and sanitation circumstances have detrimental effects on water quality. Sources such as groundwater and tap water are subject to pollution due to waste from burst sewers contaminating them. Samples taken from well water from the Pumula and Robert Sinyoka suburbs show that well water maintain levels of coliform higher than the Standards Association of Zimbabwe and World Health Organization give.

Sports
Bulawayo is home to the Queens Sports Club and Bulawayo Athletic Club, two of the three grounds in Zimbabwe where test match cricket has been played.

Bulawayo Golf Club, the first golf club in the city and country was established in 1895. The Matsheumhlope Stream cuts through the 18 hole course in the suburbs.

It is home to Hartsfield Rugby grounds where many international Test matches have been played. Hartsfield was developed by Reg Hart, after whom the grounds were named and on which field many of southern Africa's greatest rugby players have competed. It is home to two large football teams: Highlanders and Zimbabwe Saints. Other football teams include Bantu Rovers, Chicken Inn, How Mine, Quelaton, and Bulawayo City (R).

Other important sporting and recreational facilities include

Barbourfields Stadium
Zimbabwe International Trade Fair Grounds
Kumalo Hockey Stadium
Ascot Racecourse
Khami Ruins
White City Stadium
Karate centres

Transport

The city has a total road network of about 2,100 kilometres; 70 percent was declared in 2017 in a poor condition. The R2 road links Bulawayo with the Capital Harare, and the Cape to Cairo Road links with the Gaborone and Lusaka.

The Bulawayo railway station is the central point of the railway line that connects the cities of Lusaka and Gaborone (part of the Cape to Cairo Railway), as well as being the terminal of the Beira–Bulawayo railway, which connects with the cities of Gweru, Harare, Mutare and Beira. Through the station in the outskirts of Umzingwane, the city of Bulawayo is connected to the Beitbridge Bulawayo Railway.

On the 1 November 2013, a new terminal of Joshua Mqabuko Nkomo International Airport, formerly known as Bulawayo Airport, was opened.

Healthcare
Bulawayo is home to a large number of hospitals and other medical facilities. The United Bulawayo Hospitals, a public hospital network, operates Bulawayo Central Hospital, Richard Morris Hospital, Lady Rodwell Maternity Hospital, and Robbie Gibson Infectious Diseases Hospital. Mpilo Central Hospital, is the largest hospital in Bulawayo, and the second-largest in Zimbabwe, and features a nursing school and midwifery school on its campus. Bulawayo is also home to Ingutsheni Hospital, which at 700 beds is the largest psychiatric hospital in Zimbabwe. Other hospitals in Bulawayo include All Saints Children's Hospital, Hillside Hospital, Mater Dei Hospital, the Nervous Disorders Hospital, St Francis Hospital and Thorngrove Isolation Hospital.

Education
In Bulawayo, there are 128 primary and 48 secondary schools.

Primary schools

Secondary and high schools

Schools outside Bulawayo 
 Falcon College –  Esigodini
 Plumtree School – Plumtree
 Mzingwane High School - Esigodini
 St. James Girls High School - Nyamandlovu
 Rhodes Estate Preparatory School - Matopo
 George Silundika High School - Nyamandlovu

Higher education 
Bulawayo is home to a number of colleges and universities. The National University of Science and Technology, Zimbabwe, (NUST), the second largest university in Zimbabwe, was established in Bulawayo in 1991. Solusi University, a Seventh-day Adventist institution established in Bulawayo in 1894, gained university status in 1994.

The Bulawayo Polytechnic College offers tertiary training for students who have completed GCE O Level and A Level education. It issues national certificates NC, Diplomas and higher national diplomas HND certificates. Bulawayo has two specialist teacher training colleges : Hillside Teachers College for secondary education and the United College of Education for primary education.

Bulawayo is home to a number of institutes of technology and vocational colleges, including Zimbabwe School of Mines, Westgate Industrial Training College, and the Zimbabwe Theological College. In addition companies such as the National Railways of Zimbabwe NRZ and Zimbabwe Electricity and Supply Authority ZESA offer apprenticeship training for qualifying students who then become certified artisans upon completion.

Media

Newspapers 
The Chronicle, a state-owned daily newspaper, and its Sunday edition, The Sunday News, are published in Bulawayo. The Chronicle is the second-oldest newspaper in Zimbabwe, and along with The Herald, published in Harare, it is one of two major state-owned newspapers in the country. UMthunywa, a state-owned Ndebele-language newspaper, is also published in Bulawayo, where the majority of the population belongs to the Ndebele people. Private online publications like Bulawayo24 News and B-Metro are also based in Bulawayo.

Radio 
The two radio stations,  Skyz Metro FM, which is the first dedicated commercial radio station for the city and Khulumani FM, owned by the Zimbabwe Broadcasting Corporation are based in the city and offer their programming mainly in English and Ndebele and other languages spoken in the Matabeleland region. The other 6 radio stations, in which only two of those are privately owned, are also accessible in the city via FM transmission.

Television 
The state owned ZBC TV is the only free to air TV channel in the city. The majority of the households rely on the South African based satellite television distributor, DStv and OVHD for better entertainment, news and sport across Africa and the world.

Internet 
There are a number of internet service providers in the city. The majority of the population in the city access the internet through their mobile phones mainly for news, entertainment and communication.

Notable people

International relations
Bulawayo has six sister cities:

  Aberdeen, Scotland (1986)
  Durban, South Africa
  Polokwane, South Africa (2012)
  Katima Mulilo, Namibia
  Francistown, Botswana
 Livingstone, Zambia

See also

List of cities and towns in Zimbabwe

References

Bibliography

 
Populated places established in the 1840s
Populated places in Zimbabwe
Provinces of Zimbabwe
1840s establishments in Africa